Muller's velvet gecko (Homopholis mulleri) is a species of lizard in the family Gekkonidae. The species is endemic to South Africa.

Etymology
The specific name, mulleri, is in honor of South African amateur herpetologist Douglas Muller.

Geographic range
H. mulleri is found in the province of Limpopo, South Africa.

Habitat
The preferred habitat of H. mulleri is open veld, where it shelters in holes and under the loose bark of trees such as Sclerocarya birrea and Senegalia nigrescens.

Description
Dorsally, H. mulleri is light brown to dark gray, with darker and lighter markings. Ventrally, it is white. 

Males are smaller, attaining  SVL.

Reproduction
H. mulleri is oviparous.

References

Further reading
Broadley, Donald G.; Jackman, Todd R.; Bauer Aaron M. (2014). "A review of the genus Homopholis Boulenger (Reptilia: Squamata: Gekkonidae) in southern Africa". African Journal of Herpetology 63 (2): 109–126.
Visser J (1987). "A new Homopholis (Sauria, Gekkonidae) from the northern Transvaal with a discussion of some generic characters". South African Journal of Zoology 22 (2): 110–114. (Homopholis mulleri, new species). (in English, plus abstract in Afrikaans).

mulleri
Reptiles of South Africa
Reptiles described in 1987
Taxonomy articles created by Polbot